

The Bede BD-2 was an American experimental powered sailplane designed by Jim Bede to attempt an unrefuelled round-the-world flight.

Development
The BD-2 was a modified Schweizer SGS 2-32 fitted with a specially modified Continental IO-360-C engine. The BD-2 could carry 565 US gallons (2138 litres) of fuel in wing and fuselage tanks, and the modified engine produced only 30 hp (22.4 kW) during the cruise part of the flight.

The BD-2 made its first flight from Wichita on March 12, 1967. Between November 7 and 10, 1969, the aircraft set a world closed-circuit flight distance record for piston-engined aircraft, in which it covered 8,973.38 miles (14,441.26 km) in 70 hours 15 minutes. The flight had to be stopped following a complete electrical failure, and no further record flights were attempted by Bede.

The BD-2 was modified by Javelin Aircraft of Wichita as the Phoenix, which was used by Jerry Mullens to set a new closed-circuit record for piston aircraft on December 5–8, 1981 of 10,070 mi (16207 km) in 73 h 2 min, which was also the longest non-refueled flight made by a solo pilot at the time.

Specifications (Phoenix)

See also

References

Notes

Bibliography

BD-002
1960s United States experimental aircraft
Single-engined tractor aircraft
Mid-wing aircraft
Aircraft first flown in 1967